Turcica admirabilis is a species of sea snail, a marine gastropod mollusc in the family Eucyclidae.

Description
The size of the shell varies between 25 mm and 40 mm.

Distribution
This species occurs in the Pacific Ocean off Mexico and Colombia.

References

External links
 To ITIS
 To World Register of Marine Species
 

admirabilis
Gastropods described in 1969